Trocdaris is a genus of flowering plants belonging to the family Apiaceae. It has only one species, Trocdaris verticillata. Its native range is Western and Southwestern Europe and Morocco.

References

Apioideae
Monotypic Apioideae genera